Rabat Zoo ( ("Zoological Garden in Rabat"),  ("The National Park for Animals in Rabat")), also known as "Temara Zoo", is a zoological park near Rabat in Morocco that was established in 1973. The first enclosures were built to house lions that were previously kept in the royal palace.
These lions were thought to be descendants from Barbary lions.

Conservation for the lion 
Given that the Barbary lion is extinct in the wilderness, importance has been given to finding possible Barbary lions or descendants of the Barbary lion in captivity. So far, tests indicate the lions of the zoo are not pure Barbary lions, but descendants of the original Barbary lion. This is partly as members of the Moroccan royal family had kept lions that were captured from the Atlas Mountains.

Gallery

See also 
 Addis Ababa Zoo
 Drakenstein Lion Park
 Parc Sindibad, Casablanca

References

External links 
 Zoo Rabat, capital of Morocco YouTube
 Moroccan zoo is home to last of Atlas lions (allegedly)
 Parc Zoologique National ( Temara - Rabat ) - (2/2) الحديقة الوطنية للحيوانات (in Arabic

Rabat
Zoos in Morocco